Daniel "Dani" Sordo Castillo (born 2 May 1983) is a Spanish rally driver. He competes in the World Rally Championship for Hyundai Motorsport. He achieved his first WRC victory at the 2013 Rallye Deutschland.

Career
Sordo began in motocross when he was 12 years old, but also experienced success in hillclimbing, karting and touring cars. He first drove in a World Rally Championship event at the Rally Catalunya, the Spanish round of the series, in 2003 in a Mitsubishi Lancer Evo VII, finishing 18th overall. He won the Spanish Junior Championship that year, and retained the title in 2004, while also accumulating further international experience at the WRC events in Argentina (retired), Germany (19th), France (13th) and Spain (20th).

In this last event, he switched from the Lancer Evo to a Citroën C2 S1600, and for 2005 he committed to a full season driving the C2 in the Junior World Rally Championship (JWRC) with Belgium's Kronos Racing team. He also switched co-drivers, pairing with Marc Martí, the former co-driver of double World Champion Carlos Sainz. Victories in Sardinia, Finland, Germany and Spain brought him the junior world title.

These showings earned Sordo a subsequent drive in a Kronos Total Citroën-prepared Xsara World Rally Car as the team's third driver in the 2006 season, although the initial plan - latterly dropped - was for the Spaniard to combine a piecemeal World Rally Car programme with a simultaneous defence of the JWRC title in the C2.

His early results though, including successive podiums at the Rally Catalunya and the Rallye de France, proved sufficient to not only expand his complement of contested events, but also ensure promotion to the second driver berth from the Rallye Deutschland onwards, alongside Sébastien Loeb and ahead of team-mate Xavier Pons. Sordo finished the 2006 season with four podium places, 49 points and a fifth overall in the drivers' world championship.

Citroën Sport then announced that Sordo will be their second driver for their 2007 season works team return. Sébastien Loeb would lead the team's push to win another title, this time using the C4 instead of Xsara. Sordo started the season with a second place at the 2007 Monte Carlo Rally and went on to finish on the podium six more times; in Portugal, Italy, Spain, where he also led a WRC event for the first time in his career, France, Japan and Ireland. With 65 points, he placed fourth overall in the drivers' championship, behind his teammate Loeb and BP Ford World Rally Team's Marcus Grönholm and Mikko Hirvonen.

In the 2008 season, after only three points in the first three events, Sordo finished third in Argentina and second in Jordan. On 12 July Sordo won the SM O.K. Auto-Ralli, the fifth round of the Finnish Rally Championship. Initially, he only planned to use the event as a test session when Citroën decided to competitively enroll him in the event to build confidence in preparation for the 2008 Rally Finland. Sordo's win marks his first in a WRC car. Citroën is also believed to have been testing out new parts at this event as a few slight modifications could be noticed in a few cars.

Back in the World Rally Championship, Sordo took fourth place in Finland and went on to drive his C4 WRC to three consecutive runner-up finishes behind his teammate Loeb; in Germany, New Zealand and Spain. With these results, Citroën passed Ford and took a 27-point lead in the manufacturers' world championship. At the season-ending Wales Rally GB, Loeb and Sordo secured the team their fourth manufacturers' crown by finishing first and third, respectively. Sordo finished a career-best third in the drivers' standings.

In the 2010 WRC season Sordo scored a 4th place in the opening round Rally Sweden, while he scored no points in the following round in Rally Mexico. In the third round in Rally Jordan he scored another 4th place, in the Turkish Rally he was forced to retire, while in Rally New Zealand he scored 5th place and in the Rally of Portugal he scored his first podium finish of the year. In Rally Bulgaria, Sordo finished in second place behind his team leader Loeb, giving his Citroën team their first one-two finish of the season. However, he was replaced by Sebastien Ogier for the remaining gravel events of the season in the works team, and was demoted to the Citroën Junior Team alongside Kimi Räikkönen. In Rally Finland Sordo finished 4th and from Rally Deutschland onwards Dani Sordo swapped his co-driver to Diego Vallejo. In Rally Deutschland itself Sordo scored another 2nd place podium. In the following Rally in Japan he finished 4th and in Rally Alsace 2nd again. At the end of the season he had 63 points using the old scoring system in 5th place.
For the 2011 season Sordo joined MINI in their first year in the WRC, securing 2 podiums with 3rd in Germany and 2nd in France, respectively. He also finished 4th in Spain and 6th in the first round for MINI in Sardegnia. For 2012 he continues his partnership with MINI for their first full season beginning with the Monte Carlo Rally, where he took his first podium for 2012 finishing in second place. However, in Sweden he went off road and scored no points. Sordo did not compete in the Rally Mexico due to MINI separating from Prodrive. A round later, however, after some more than 100 modifications to the MINI, Sordo won 6 stages including the power stage. Sordo was set to replace Ford's number one driver Jari-Matti Latvala in Argentina, after the Finn was injured in practice for the upcoming event, the only event he drove for Ford, after which he competed in New-Zealand, Germany, France and Spain for Prodrive as the team tried to focus on the sealed surfaces.

Besides competing in the WRC for 2012, Sordo participated in the IRC in the Tour de Corse in a MINI. He won the event and took his maiden win in the IRC championship. After 2 seasons in the Prodrive (MINI) Team, Sordo rejoined Citroën for 2013 driving the second DS3 WRC.

At 2013 Rallye Deustchland, Sordo was in a stable third position in the second of three days, but after first placed Jari-Matti Latvala and second placed Thierry Neuville both left the road, Sordo found himself in the lead, with the Belgian just 0.8 seconds behind him at the end of the day, with just two stages to go. He eventually managed to hold on to first place and finally, after a nail-biting Power Stage and at his 106th WRC start, Dani Sordo won a WRC round.

Since the 2014 season Sordo moved to the new Hyundai Motorsport team and drives the second or third car in selected events. 

In 2019, he achieved the second victory of his career at Rally Italia Sardegna. Sordo, was second for most of the rally behind Ott Tänak, but the Estonian suffered a power steering failure at the power stage, giving victory to Dani.

A year later, he won the 2020 Rally Italia Sardegna, his second victory in a row at the event. He is the only driver alongside Sébastien Loeb, Sébastien Ogier and Thierry Neuville, to win the Italian Rally on multiple times. In the next race in Rally Monza, after leading the overall virtually, finally finished third, helping Hyundai win the constructors' championship.

In October 2021, he renewed his contract through the 2022 season with Hyundai. After the renewal, he announced that 2022 would be his last season. At 2021 Rally Catalunya, after winning four stages in a row (SS15, SS16, SS17 and power stage), he finished 3rd in the rally, achieving his 50th podium in the WRC.

WRC victories

{|class="wikitable"
!  # 
! Event
! Season
! Co-driver
! Car
|-
| 1
|  31. ADAC Rallye Deutschland
| 2013
| Carlos del Barrio
| Citroën DS3 WRC
|-
|2
| 16° Rally Italia Sardegna
|2019
|Carlos del Barrio
|Hyundai i20 Coupe WRC
|-
|3
| 17º Rally Italia Sardegna
|2020 
|Carlos del Barrio
|Hyundai i20 Coupe WRC
|-
|}

Career results

Complete WRC results

* Season still in progress.

JWRC results

IRC results

ERC results

Footnotes

External links

 Official website
 eWRC-results.com profile

1983 births
Living people
People from Torrelavega
World Rally Championship drivers
Rally drivers from Cantabria
Spanish rally drivers
Intercontinental Rally Challenge drivers
International GT Open drivers
European Rally Championship drivers
Citroën Racing drivers
Hyundai Motorsport drivers